The 2016 BeNe Ladies Tour was the third edition of the BeNe Ladies Tour, a women's cycling stage race in the Netherlands and Belgium. It was rated by the UCI as a category 2.2 race and was held between 15 and 17 July 2016. The race was won by Jolien D'Hoore.

Route

Stages

Stage 1
15 July 2016 – Philippine to Philippine,

Stage 2a
16 July 2016 – Sint-Laureins to Sint-Laureins,

Stage 2b
16 July 2016 – Sint-Laureins to Sint-Laureins, (individual time trial)

Stage 3
17 July 2016 – Zelzate to Zelzate,

Classification leadership

See also

 2016 in women's road cycling

References

External links

BeNe Ladies Tour
BeNe Ladies Tour